Austin Krajicek and Jackson Withrow were the defending champions but only Krajicek chose to defend his title, partnering Matt Reid. Krajicek withdrew before the tournament began due to injury.

Roberto Maytín and Fernando Romboli won the title after defeating Evan King and Nathan Pasha 7–5, 6–3 in the final.

Seeds

Draw

References
 Main Draw

Morelos Open - Doubles
2018 Doubles